Kay Hanley (born September 11, 1968) is an American singer and songwriter. She is best known as the vocalist for the alternative rock band Letters to Cleo.

Life and career

Hanley grew up in Dorchester, Massachusetts across the street from the Wahlberg family. She attended school at St. Gregory's and Latin Academy. She has been lead singer/songwriter for rock band Letters To Cleo since 1990. The band name was inspired by Hanley's childhood penpal.  

In 1994, she co-starred alongside Gary Cherone in Boston Rock Opera's performance of Jesus Christ Superstar as Mary Magdalene.

In 1999, Hanley appeared as herself in the film 10 Things I Hate About You, singing a cover version of Nick Lowe's "Cruel to Be Kind" to Heath Ledger and Julia Stiles at their characters' high school prom, in addition to performing original song "Come On" with Letters to Cleo during an earlier scene at a club.  Towards the end of the 90s she began performing with her then-husband and fellow Letters To Cleo member Michael Eisenstein outside of the band. Around the same time, she gave birth to their daughter, Zoe Mabel.

In 1999 Hanley began a shift in her music career.  She wrote and performed songs for the Kids' WB cartoon series Generation O! along with the rest of Letters to Cleo and provided the singing voice for Rachael Leigh Cook's character Josie in the movie Josie and the Pussycats. In 2002, she released her first solo album, Cherry Marmalade. That same year, she appeared on the Dropkick Murphys/Face to Face split CD, providing guest vocals on the original version of the Dropkick Murphys song "The Dirty Glass".

In 2003, Hanley was approached by Jun Senoue from Sega to co-write and perform on an original song for their upcoming entry in the Sonic the Hedgehog series, entitled Sonic Heroes. The result was the song "Follow Me."

In 2004, Hanley released a follow up to Cherry Marmalade, The Babydoll EP. That same year, she and her then-husband Michael Eisenstein had their second child, Henry Aaron, the name given in honor of baseball player Hank Aaron and their love for baseball.

In August 2005, Hanley recorded a cover of Iggy Pop's "Lust for Life" for the soundtrack of the Reese Witherspoon film Just Like Heaven. In September 2005, she appeared on The Tonight Show with Jay Leno as part of a pre-taped man-on-the-street segment, singing a song about falling in love at Starbucks.

Hanley is popular with fans of the New England Patriots thanks to the team at one point going  after she sang the pre-game National Anthem at Gillette Stadium.  The streak came to an end when the Patriots lost on January 10, 2010, to the Baltimore Ravens. Hanley is also very involved with the Boston-based charity "Hot Stove, Cool Music," both as performer and spokesperson for the semi-annual event, which has raised over 6 million dollars for The Foundation To Be Named Later 

She sang the theme song  for My Friends Tigger & Pooh, a half-hour Disney Channel TV show that premiered on Playhouse Disney on May 12, 2007, and "We Are Care Bears" from Care Bears: Oopsy Does It! and Care Bears to the Rescue.

Hanley and longtime writing partner Michelle Lewis currently compose all-original songs for animated television shows such as the hit Disney series Doc McStuffins.,
Cartoon Network/WB's DC Super Hero Girls, and Harvey Girls Forever and Ada Twist, Scientist on Netflix.
Hanley won a 2022 Emmy Award for songwriting on We The People.

She and writing partners Michelle Lewis, Dan Petty, and Charlton Pettus created Kindergarten The Musical. In production at Disney Junior, the show will debut in Fall 2024. Hanley serves as executive producer.

She is co-executive director of Songwriters of North America, an LA-based non-profit which advocates for fair pay and other rights for songwriters. Due to her work with SONA in getting the Music Modernization Act passed into law in October 2018, Hanley was elected Vice Chair of the Mechanical Licensing Collective's Unclaimed Royalties Oversight Committee in August 2019

On Thanksgiving Day 2007, Hanley sang a song called "Caring Changes The World" in the Macy's Thanksgiving Day Parade on the Care Bears float.

In 2007–08, Hanley toured as a back-up singer with Miley Cyrus for Hannah Montana concerts and events.

Hanley's latest album, Weaponize, was released May 27, 2008.

Hanley co-wrote "Don't Wanna Be Famous" on the band The Dollyrots' eponymous album.

In 2014, Kay Hanley appeared in the Parks and Recreation season 6 finale, performing her song "Here & Now" at the Pawnee-Eagleton Unity Concert. The character of Ben Wyatt, played by Adam Scott, is seen offstage in his Letters to Cleo t-shirt, blissfully watching the band as Hanley winks at him. Hanley is seen later in the episode entering Tom Haverford's new restaurant, Tom's Bistro.

In 2020, at the height of the COVID-19 pandemic, she appeared as lead vocalist in a "distanced" music video, a cover of Donnie Iris's "Ah! Leah!" Later that year, she appeared on Saving for a Custom Van, a tribute album for Adam Schlesinger, with whom she had worked on Josie and the Pussycats, following his death from COVID-19. She performed the Fountains of Wayne song "Radiation Vibe" in his memory.

Hanley married audio engineer Clayton Janes in 2021 in Bentonville, Arkansas

Discography

Letters to Cleo

Pet Projects
The title of this section indicates projects that both Hanley and Eisenstein have taken an active interest in developing, in terms of playing multiple roles, including production as well as composition and/or instrumentation.

Solo

Soundtracks

Special appearances

Filmography

Further reading
MacNeil, Jason. "Kay Hanley". Allmusic. Retrieved January 21, 2012.

References

External links
 Kay Hanley on Twitter
 Letters to Cleo website
 Kay Hanley's MySpace
 
 Kay and USA Mike's Lynx

Women rock singers
Living people
Zoë Records artists
21st-century American women singers
21st-century American singers
Letters to Cleo members
1968 births